Oughton Nature Reserve in Hitchin in Hertfordshire is managed by the Herts and Middlesex Wildlife Trust. The 6.2-hectare site on the north bank of the River Oughton is not publicly accessible, but it can be viewed across the river from Oughtonhead Common.

The site has a variety of habitats, including wet and dry woodland, the river margin and fen areas. Willow, reed and rush were formerly grown and harvested in the wetter areas, and there was a corn mill at the eastern end. Birds include kingfishers, water rails and woodcock, and there are mammals such as water shrews.

References

Herts and Middlesex Wildlife Trust reserves
Hitchin